Proechimys is a genus of South American spiny rats of the family Echimyidae. All species of the genus are terrestrial. In the lowland Neotropical forests, Proechimys rodents are often the most abundant non-volant mammals. They are recognizable by reason of their elongated heads and long rostra, large and erect ears, narrow and long hind feet, and tails always shorter than head-and-body lengths. The dorsal pelage comprises a mixture of expanded, varyingly stiffened spines (or aristiforms) — hence the vernacular name of spiny rats — and soft hairs (or setiforms).

Proechimys is the most speciose genus of the rodent family Echimyidae, with 25 species recognized, followed by Phyllomys with 13 species, and Trinomys with 11 species.

Phylogeny

Genus level
The genus Proechimys is the sister group to the genus Hoplomys (the armored rat). In turn, these two taxa share evolutionary affinities with other Myocastorini genera: Callistomys (the painted tree-rat) and Myocastor (the coypu or nutria) on the one hand, and Thrichomys on the other hand.

Species level
Reconstructing the systematics and phylogeny of Proechimys species have been greatly hampered by extreme levels of within- and among-population character variability. This difficulty has been emphasized by Pine et al.:

To infer the phylogeny of Proechimys at the species level, morphological characters and mitochondrial DNA sequences have been used, and allowed to group species into major clades but whose interrelationships remain unresolved. Six species groups were identified (group semispinosus, group longicaudatus, group guyannensis, group trinitatus, group goeldii, and group gardneri), and 4 species (Proechimys simonsi, P. echinothrix, P. canicollis, and P. decumanus) remained unaffiliated to any of these groups.

The different groups of species can be diagnosed as follows.
 Group semispinosus: it contains two species, Proechimys semispinosus, — with its widespread range, from Central America south from Honduras along the west coast of Colombia and Ecuador — and P. oconnelli, with a more limited range, east of the Cordillera Oriental in the north-western Amazon.
 Group longicaudatus: it contains the three species Proechimys longicaudatus, P. brevicauda, and P. cuvieri, united by lyrate and strongly fanged incisive foramina, and deep groves extending onto the anterior palate. They range from the lowland rainforest of the Guianan region and Amazon basin to dry forests of eastern Bolivia, northern Paraguay, and central Brazil.
 Group guyannensis: it contains the two species Proechimys guyannensis, and P. roberti, showing a plantar surface of hindfeet with six pads, and distributed mostly in the Guianan region, eastern Amazonia, and extending south into central Brazil.
 Group trinitatus: it contains the eight species Proechimys trinitatus, P. mincae, P. guairae, P. poliopus, P. magdalenae, P. chrysaeolus, P. urichi, and P. hoplomyoides. These taxa possess large and open incisive foramina, and simplified cheek teeth.
 Group goeldii: it contains the three species Proechimys steerei, P. quadruplicatus, and P. goeldii, united by a uniformly large body size. Members of this group most commonly inhabit the seasonally inundated várzea or igapó lowland forests of the Amazon basin.
They are distributed in western Amazonia, but with non-overlapping ranges as all three species replace one another along the length of the Juruá River or on its opposite banks.

Distribution
Proechimys species presently occur mainly in South America, in all countries except Argentina, Uruguay, and Chile. One member of the genus (P. semispinosus) also ranges into Central America.

References

 
Echimyidae
Rodent genera
Taxa named by Joel Asaph Allen